is a fantasy comedy anime series based on the Cocotama House Series of toys created by Bandai Namco Holdings. The series is directed by Norio Nitta and written by Michihiro Tsuchiya with character designs by Shinobu Ookawa. The series began airing on all TXN stations in Japan from October 1, 2015 to June 28, 2018 replacing Tamagotchi! on its initial timeslot. It was succeeded by the second series, Kira Kira Happy Hirake! Cocotama.

The music for the series is composed by Ryosuke Nakanishi.

Episode List

Arc 1, First Part

Arc 1, Second Part

Arc 2: Raichi and Hikari

Arc 3: Lost Pants Arc

References

General
http://www.tv-tokyo.co.jp/anime/cocotama-himitsu/trailer/
http://www.tv-tokyo.co.jp/anime/cocotama-himitsu/episodes/

Specific

Kamisama Minarai: Himitsu no Cocotama
Cocotama